Carl Krusada (1879–1951) was an Austrian-born American screenwriter. He began his career in the silent era, sometimes using the name Val Cleveland. During the 1930s he worked prolifically writing screenplays for B Westerns produced by a variety of Poverty Row companies.

Selected filmography

 The Scoffer (1920)
 White Eagle (1922)
 The Timber Queen (1922)
 Solomon in Society (1922)
 The Truth About Wives (1923)
 Winning a Woman (1925)
 Ridin' Thunder (1925)
 Lorraine of the Lions (1925)
 King of the Saddle (1926)
 The Valley of Bravery (1926)
 The Trail of the Tiger (1927)
 The Arizona Whirlwind (1927)
 The Golden Stallion (1927)
 Heroes of the Wild (1927)
 Three Miles Up (1927)
 Won in the Clouds (1928)
 The Price of Fear (1928)
 The Vanishing Rider (1928)
 How to Handle Women (1928)
 Beauty and Bullets (1928)
 The Gate Crasher (1928)
 The Crimson Canyon (1928)
 Thunder Riders (1928)
 The Sky Skidder (1929)
 The Phantom of the North (1929)
 Grit Wins (1929)
 Eyes of the Underworld (1929)
 Wolves of the City (1929)
 The Smiling Terror (1929)
 Born to the Saddle (1929)
 Beyond the Rio Grande (1930)
 The Phantom of the Desert (1930)
 Slim Fingers (1929)
 Firebrand Jordan (1930)
 Westward Bound (1930)
 Lariats and Six-Shooters (1931)
 45 Calibre Echo (1932)
 Dance Hall Hostess (1933)
 Ridin' Thru (1934)
 Mystery Ranch (1934)
 Terror of the Plains (1934)
 Fighting Hero (1934)
 Unconquered Bandit (1935)
 The Cactus Kid (1935)
 Silent Valley (1935)
 Texas Jack (1935)
 The Silver Bullet (1935)
 The Laramie Kid (1935)
 North of Arizona (1935)
 Wolf Riders (1935)
 The Live Wire (1935)
 The Phantom Cowboy (1935)
 Loser's End (1935)
 Born to Battle (1935)
 Coyote Trails (1935)
 Skull and Crown (1935)
 Rio Rattler (1935)
 Fast Bullets (1936)
 Santa Fe Bound (1936)
 Fangs of the Wild (1939)
 Law of the Wolf (1939)
 El Diablo Rides (1939)
 Feud of the Range (1939)
 Riders of the Sage (1939)
 The Pal from Texas (1939)
 Pinto Canyon (1940)
 Wild Horse Valley (1940)
 Wild Horse Range (1940)
 Land of the Six Guns (1940)
 The Kid from Santa Fe (1940)
 Riders from Nowhere (1940)
 Broken Strings (1940)

References

Bibliography
 Munden, Kenneth White. The American Film Institute Catalog of Motion Pictures Produced in the United States, Part 1. University of California Press, 1997.
 Zmuda, Michael. The Five Sedgwicks: Pioneer Entertainers of Vaudeville, Film and Television. McFarland, 2015.

External links

1879 births
1951 deaths
Austrian emigrants to the United States
Austrian screenwriters
American screenwriters
People from Vienna